Hélyette Geman is a French academic in the field of mathematical finance.  Her career has spanned several sub-disciplines including insurance, probability theory and the finance of commodities. She is a Professor of Mathematical Finance at Birkbeck College, University of London  where she is the Director of the Commodity Finance Centre and Research Professor at Johns Hopkins University.

Notable Research and Activities
Helyette Geman is most known for:
 Her collaboration with Nicole El Karoui in starting the sought-after postgraduate mathematical finance course,  jointly operated by the French Universities École Polytechnique and Pierre and Marie Curie University.
 Her work on financial numéraire, with Nicole El Karoui.
 Her introduction of a stochastic clock to recover the normality of asset returns
 Her work on Catastrophe Futures and Options
 Her work on probability distributions, specifically the "CGMY" Lévy process named after Carr, Helyette Geman, Madan and Yor.
 Her 2005 book on Commodities Derivatives.
 Her book 'Insurance, Weather and Electricity Derivatives : From Exotic Options to Exotic Underlyings', 1999, Risk Books.
 Her work on 'Bitcoins and Commodities'
 Being the PhD supervisor of Nassim Nicholas Taleb

Selected publications
 Changes of Numeraire, Changes of Probability Measure and Option Pricing, with Nicole El Karoui, Jean-Charles Rochet. Journal of Applied Probability, Vol. 32, No. 2 (Jun., 1995), pp. 443–458
 The Fine Structure of Asset Returns: An Empirical Investigation, with Peter Carr, Dilip B. Madan, and Marc Yor. The Journal of Business 75 (2) (April 2002): 305–332.
 Order Flow, Transaction Clock and Normality of Asset Returns, Journal of Finance, Oct 2000, Vol 55, pp. 2259-2284
 Stochastic Time Changes in Catastrophe Option Pricing Insurance, Mathematics and Economics, Dec 1997, Vol 21, pp. 185-193.

Awards
 2022 IAQF/Northfield Financial Engineer of the Year Award
 Member of Honour - French Society of Actuaries
 Energy Risk - Hall of Fame.

References

External links
 Personal Homepage: http://www.helyettegeman.com
 Personal Homepage: http://www.ems.bbk.ac.uk/faculty/geman/
 Mathematics Genealogy Project: https://www.genealogy.math.ndsu.nodak.edu/id.php?id=213191

Living people
21st-century French mathematicians
French women mathematicians
Financial economists
Academic staff of the University of Paris
Academics of Birkbeck, University of London
Year of birth missing (living people)